David Bicknell Truman (June 1, 1913 – August 28, 2003) was an American academic who served as the 15th president of Mount Holyoke College from 1969–1978. He is also known for his role as a Columbia University administrator during the Columbia University protests of 1968. Truman was an elected member of both the American Philosophical Society and the American Academy of Arts and Sciences.

Background and family
Truman was born and raised in Highpoint, NC. He received his B.A. from Amherst and his doctorate from the University of Chicago.

Political science
Truman was a prominent political scientist and is known for his contributions to the theory of political pluralism.

Administrative roles
He taught at a number of institutions before joining Columbia University in 1950. There, in addition to teaching political science, he undertook a number of administrative roles, serving successively as head of the department of public law and government (1959–61), Dean of Columbia College (1962–67), and Vice-President and Provost (1967–69). In 1969, Truman "stepped down after a tumultuous year of student unrest. During the student-lead [sic] takeover of the University, Truman was continually mentioned as a University administrator who retained the student body's respect."

Truman became president of Mount Holyoke College in 1969 and stayed until 1978. Truman oversaw the decision to remain a woman's college in 1971.

His obituary from Mount Holyoke noted, "both at Columbia and Mount Holyoke, Truman was involved in dealing with the significant student unrest of the late 1960s and 1970s. At both campuses he faced student protests and takeovers regarding such difficult issues as race and the Vietnam War. Despite these challenges, which were common on college campuses during the Vietnam Era, Truman left a lasting legacy as a warm and caring leader."

Scholarship
 Administrative Decentralization (1940)
 The Governmental Process: Political Interests and Public Opinion. New York: Knopf, 1951
 The Congressional Party (1959)

References 

American political scientists
Political science educators
Mount Holyoke College faculty
Presidents and Principals of Mount Holyoke College
Amherst College alumni
Columbia University faculty
People from Evanston, Illinois
University of Chicago faculty
1913 births
2003 deaths
Social Science Research Council
20th-century American academics
20th-century political scientists
Members of the American Philosophical Society